Morten Avery "Specs" Clark (December 19, 1889 – November 17, 1943) was an American baseball shortstop in the pre-Negro leagues.

He was born December 19, 1889 in Bristol, Tennessee, and played professional baseball for the Birmingham Giants in 1908. He would play a large part of his career for the Indianapolis ABCs.

Clark died in Los Angeles on November 17, 1943 and is buried at the National Cemetery in Los Angeles, California. His World War I draft registration card showed him single, as of 1917.

Almost a decade after his death, Clark received votes listing him on the 1952 Pittsburgh Courier player-voted poll of the Negro Leagues' best players ever. (Some papers have him listed as "Martin" Clark.)

References

External links
 and Baseball-Reference Black Baseball stats and Seamheads

Baseball players from Tennessee
Baltimore Black Sox players
Birmingham Giants players
Brooklyn Royal Giants players
Indianapolis ABCs players
Lincoln Giants players
Lincoln Stars (baseball) players
Philadelphia Giants players
Schenectady Mohawk Giants players
Washington Potomacs players
1889 births
1943 deaths
20th-century African-American people